Alan or Allan Goldman may refer to:
Alan H. Goldman (born 1945), American philosopher
Alan J. Goldman (1932–2010), American expert in operations research
Alan S. Goldman (born 1958), American chemist
Allan H. Goldman (born 1943), American real estate investor

See also 
Alain Goldman (born 1961), French film producer